{{DISPLAYTITLE:C26H28Cl2N4O4}}
The molecular formula C26H28Cl2N4O4 (molar mass: 531.43 g/mol, exact mass: 530.1488 u) may refer to:

 Ketoconazole
 Levoketoconazole